Formoso do Araguaia is a municipality in the state of Tocantins in the Northern region of Brazil. It is the largest municipality by area in that state.

See also
List of municipalities in Tocantins

References

Populated places established in 1963
Municipalities in Tocantins